Real Cartagena is a professional Colombian football team based in Cartagena, that currently plays in the Categoría Primera B. They play their home games at the Jaime Morón León stadium.

History
The origins of Real Cartagena date back to 1971, when Atlético Bucaramanga, which by the end of 1970 was going through a serious economic crisis which threatened its survival, rented its right to compete in the Colombian football championship. On 5 January 1971, DIMAYOR and Atlético Bucaramanga representatives met in Cartagena with counterparts from the city's local government and the Bolívar football league (Liga de Fútbol de Bolívar) and reached an agreement that saw Atlético Bucaramanga move to Cartagena with its squad and colours for the 1971 season, adopting the name Real Cartagena.

The team's first match was a friendly against Atlético Junior on 31 January 1971 at Estadio Pedro de Heredia which ended in a 1–1 draw, whilst its first match in the domestic league was played on 7 February 1971, a 1–0 win over Once Caldas. After this victory, Real Cartagena went winless for 10 games, and ended in 11th place in both the Apertura and Finalización tournaments. By the end of the year, Atlético Bucaramanga had solved its financial issues and the squad returned to their original name and colours for the following season, playing its first home matches in the 1972 Apertura tournament in Cartagena as a token of gratitude before returning to Bucaramanga.

After this experience in professional football, the club was bought by Pedro Juan Paternina and Miguel Guerra Pacheco and started playing in the amateur tournaments of the Bolívar Department league. By 1983, Real Cartagena started experiencing economic problems and was able to sign a partnership with Millonarios which turned it into the latter's official academy team in Cartagena. This partnership lasted until 1989. After this, the club changed its name to Atlético Cartagena and in 1991 it entered the newly formed third tier competition Categoría Primera C, reaching the final stage but failing to earn promotion to Categoría Primera B as they ended in third place.

In 1991 the Colombian football championship, now named Categoría Primera A, returned to Cartagena with Unión Magdalena's temporary move to the city under the name Unión La Cartagenera. With interest in football in the city peaking with the presence of a top-flight team as well as Atlético Cartagena's good performance in the lower tiers, local entrepreneurs moved themselves to help Cartagena have a representative in professional football. Thus, they bought Atlético Cartagena and rebranded it back to its original name of Real Cartagena, and then with the approval of DIMAYOR, bought the affiliation rights of Sporting de Barranquilla which went bankrupt by then. Real Cartagena was officially registered as a DIMAYOR affiliate club on 2 February 1992 and played its first match in Primera A seven days later, a 1–0 defeat to Unión Magdalena. The 1992 season ended with the club placing last and being relegated to Primera B.

The club spent seven years in the second tier, receiving economic support from América de Cali which turned Real Cartagena into a satellite club and helped it build a strong team to win the Primera B championship in 1999 and return to the top flight. Real Cartagena's third spell in Primera A lasted three years until 2002, when they were relegated once again. In 2003, the club failed to qualify for the Primera B play-offs, but in 2004 it reached the final against Deportivo Antioquia after clinching their qualification on the final day of the semifinal stage in a controversial match against Valledupar in which Real Cartagena scored four goals in the final five minutes of play to win 5–0 and edge Cúcuta Deportivo out on goal difference. They eventually beat Deportivo Antioquia over two legs in the final to win the competition and claim promotion back to the top flight.

In 2005, Real Cartagena did its best campaign ever in Primera A, placing in the top eight of the Finalización tournament and advancing to the semi-finals, in which they were placed into Group B along with Santa Fe, Independiente Medellín, and Deportivo Pereira. Real ended on top of the group with 10 points after winning 4–0 against Santa Fe on the final matchday, beating Independiente Medellín on goal difference to advance to the final series of the tournament. There they faced Deportivo Cali, losing both matches to end as tournament runners-up. The team's strong performance at home played a big role in this campaign, with 11 victories in 13 matches, and they also had in Jamerson Rentería one of the tournament's joint goalscorers, with 12 goals. The club was unable to replicate this performance in the following two years and were relegated at the end of the 2007 season, however, they were immediately promoted back the following year, defeating Deportivo Rionegro in the 2008 Primera B final.

Real Cartagena were relegated for the fourth time in history in 2012, after a 2–0 defeat at the hands of La Equidad left them unable to catch up with Patriotas and Cúcuta Deportivo in the relegation table, in which they earned only 117 points out of 321 possible ones. Since then, they have stayed in the second tier of Colombian football. In 2020, 74% of the club's shares was sold by the Rendón family to the player agency ColombiaGol, owned by player agent Helmut Wenning, which became the club's major shareholder. Upon its takeover of the club, ColombiaGol aimed to use the professional squad to promote youth footballers from the region.

Home stadium

Real Cartagena play their home matches at the Estadio Jaime Morón León in Cartagena, formerly known as Estadio Pedro de Heredia after Cartagena's founder Pedro de Heredia, with a capacity of 16,068 people.

Kits
 Home: Yellow shirt, green shorts and white socks.
 Away: White shirt, black shorts and white socks.

Kit manufacturer

Honours

Domestic
 Categoría Primera A: 0
Runners-up (1): 2005-II

 Categoría Primera B: 3
1999, 2004, 2008-II

Current roster

Managers
  Alberto Rujana (2001–02)
 Orlando Restrepo (2003)
 Néstor Otero (Jan 2006–June 6)
 Álvaro de Jesús Gómez (2006)
  Hubert Bodhert (July 2008–??)
 Mario Vanemerak (Oct 2011–April 12)
 German Basilico González (May 2012–Aug 12)
  Hubert Bodhert (Aug 2012–Nov 12)
 José Santa (Nov 2012–13)
 José Dominguez (2014)
  Hubert Bodhert (2014–1?)
 Giovanni Hernández (2016–)

Affiliated teams
 Mallorca

References

External links
 Official website
 Real Cartagena profile in DIMAYOR

 
Football clubs in Colombia
Association football clubs established in 1971
1971 establishments in Colombia
Categoría Primera A clubs
Categoría Primera B clubs